The Military Committee for National Liberation was the body that ruled Mali by decree after the 1968 coup d'état.

Members (in 1970)
 President: Lieutenant Moussa Traore
 Vice Presidents: Capt. Yoro Diakite, Lieut. 
 Commissioner: Lieut. Y. Traore
 Secretary: Lieut. P. Sissoko
 Members: Lieutenants T. Bagayoko. J. Marat, M. Sanogho, C. Toukara, M. Kone, K. Dembele and Captains M. Diallo, C. Sissoko and M. Sissoko

Sources
 The Europa World Year Book 1970

Politics of Mali
Political organisations based in Mali